Agabus  was an early follower of Christianity mentioned in the Acts of the Apostles as a prophet. He is traditionally remembered as one of the Seventy Disciples described in Luke .

Biblical and traditional accounts 
According to extrabiblical tradition, Agabus appears to have been a resident of Jerusalem. He is said to have been one of the seventy disciples, mentioned in the Gospel of Luke, commissioned to preach the gospel. It is said that Agabus was with the twelve apostles in the upper room on the day of Pentecost.

According to Acts , he was one of a group of prophets who travelled from Jerusalem to Antioch. The author reports that Agabus had received the gift of prophecy and predicted a severe famine, which occurred during the reign of the emperor Claudius.

Also, according to Acts , 'a certain prophet', named Agabus met Paul the Apostle at Caesarea Maritima in AD 58. Agabus warned Paul of his coming capture; he bound his own hands and feet with Paul's belt to demonstrate what would happen if he continued his journey to Jerusalem, stating the message of the Holy Spirit:
So shall the Jews at Jerusalem bind the man who owns this belt, and deliver him into the hands of the Gentiles.
Paul, however, would not be persuaded to stay away.

Agabus' symbolic action has been compared  with the Jewish prophet Jeremiah:

Thus the LORD said to me, "Go and buy yourself a linen waistband and put it around your waist, but do not put it in water." So I bought the waistband in accordance with the word of the LORD and put it around my waist ... For as a belt is bound around the waist, so I bound all the people of Israel and all the people of Judah to me,' declares the LORD, 'to be my people for my renown and praise and honor.

Tradition says that Agabas went to many countries, teaching and converting many. This moved the Jews of Jerusalem to arrest him, and they tortured him by beating him severely, and putting a rope around his neck. He was dragged outside the city and stoned to death. Jesuit theologian Anthony Maas says he was martyred at Antioch.

Veneration
The Roman Catholic Church celebrates his feast day on February 13, while the Eastern Christianity celebrates it on March 8.

See also 
 Paul the Apostle
 Barnabas
 Saint Stephen

References 

1st-century Christian martyrs
People in Acts of the Apostles
Prophets of the New Testament
Christian saints from the New Testament
Seventy disciples